Dawson Park may refer to:

 Dawson Park (Broughty Ferry), a sports field in Broughty Ferry, Dundee, Scotland
 Dawson Park (Portland, Oregon), a park in northeast Portland, Oregon, United States